Frederick Whittaker (1886 – after 1913) was an English professional footballer who played as an inside forward and an outside forward.

During Exeter City's tour of South America in 1914, Whittaker played in every game, including in the Brazilian national team's first ever game, scoring five goals.

References

People from Nelson, Lancashire
English footballers
Association football forwards
Burnley F.C. players
Bradford City A.F.C. players
Northampton Town F.C. players
Exeter City F.C. players
Millwall F.C. players
English Football League players
Year of death missing
1886 births